Capitol Medical Center is a for-profit general hospital located in Quezon City, Philippines.

History
The hospital was founded by Thelma N. Clemente, Luis C. Clemente and fellow medical professionals.

The groundbreaking of the hospital took place on May 1, 1968, and was inaugurated on March 19, 1970. It opened to the public a few months later on June 22, 1970. In 2013 it is reported that the Capitol Medical Center has 300 beds, 200 more than the initial 100 beds upon its establishment.

The first kidney transplant was done in the hospital in November 1970. The hospital also had national firsts such as the first private hospital to host a center for Spinal Disorder which was established in 1977, the first Digital Infrared Thermograph Imaging system acquired in 1983.

Capitol continued to expand and upgrade its facilities. The hospital established a voice and swallowing clinic catering to voice professionals and dysphagic individuals which the hospital administration describes as the first of its kind. In 2003 the first Laparoscopic Nephrectomy was performed by the hospital's surgeons.

Before founder, Thelma N. Clemente's death on November 11, 2016, a new and complete facilities for heart bypass operations were installed in the hospital.

In 2017, Capitol Medical Center, Inc. established a partnership with Mount Grace Hospitals, Inc.

References

Hospital buildings completed in 1970
Hospitals in Quezon City
Hospitals established in 1970
1970 establishments in the Philippines
Buildings and structures in Quezon City
20th-century architecture in the Philippines